Müge Anlı Yüzbaşıoğlu (born 19 December 1973) is a Turkish television presenter and journalist.

After presenting the news magazine program Dobra Dobra, she started her own discussion program, Müge Anlı ile Tatlı Sert, on ATV. In the program, people who are looking for their lost relatives are welcomed, and issues such as unsolved murders and lost victims who cannot be found are discussed.

Personal life
Anlı is of Albanian and Crimean Tatar descent. 

Between 1999 and 2008, she was married to journalist Burhan Akdağ. Together they have a daughter. In June 2022, Anlı married Istanbul Police Public Security Branch's manager Şinasi Yüzbaşıoğlu.

Television programs

Awards

References

External links
 
 Müge Anlı ile Tatlı Sert on ATV

Living people
1973 births
Turkish television presenters
Golden Butterfly Award winners